Erebia hispania, the Spanish brassy ringlet, is a species of butterfly of the family Nymphalidae, endemic to the Sierra Nevada of southern Spain. The taxon rondoui (from the Pyrenees), previously considered as a subspecies of Erebia hispania, is considered now as a different species (Erebia rondoui) according to the results obtained in molecular studies.

The wingspan is 34–42 mm. Adults are on wing from July to August.

The larvae feed on various grasses, including Festuca species.

References
   (2018): About the distribution -updated and corrected- of Erebia hispania Butler, 1868, endemic in the Sierra Nevada (South Spain) (Lepidoptera: Nymphalidae, Satyrinae). ISSN 0171-0079|Atalanta 49 (1/4): 111-114. (PDF)

Erebia
Butterflies of Europe
Butterflies described in 1868
Taxa named by Arthur Gardiner Butler